Mark Scott (born 24 March 1959) is a former Australian rules footballer who played for Hawthorn, St Kilda and Fitzroy in the VFL during the 1980s.

Although Scott, a full-forward, had a career in the VFL which spanned over a decade he is probably best known for his performances in the reserves. In 168 reserve games he kicked 655 goals, only showing similar goalkicking skills in the seniors at St Kilda. He topped the Saint's goalkicking twice, with 48 goals in 1980 and 45 goals in 1982. He had started the 1980 season with Hawthorn but during the season was traded to St Kilda for Russell Greene.

References
Holmesby, Russell and Main, Jim (2007). The Encyclopedia of AFL Footballers. 7th ed. Melbourne: Bas Publishing.

External links

1959 births
Living people
Hawthorn Football Club players
St Kilda Football Club players
Fitzroy Football Club players
Burnie Hawks Football Club players
Australian rules footballers from Victoria (Australia)